WSO2 is an open-source technology provider founded in 2005. It offers an enterprise platform for integrating application programming interfaces (APIs), applications, and web services locally and across the Internet.

History 
WSO2 was founded by Sanjiva Weerawarana, Paul Fremantle and Davanum Srinivas in August 2005, backed by Intel Capital, Toba Capital, and Pacific Controls. Weerawarana was an IBM researcher and a founder of the Web services platform. He led the creation of IBM SOAP4J, which later became Apache SOAP, and was the architect of other notable projects. Fremantle was one of the authors of IBM's Web Services Invocation Framework and the Web Services Gateway. An Apache member since the original Apache SOAP project, Freemantle oversaw the donation of WSIF and WSDL4J to Apache and led IBM's involvement in the Axis C/C++ project. Fremantle became WSO2's chief technology officer (CTO) in 2008, and was named one of Infoworld's Top 25 CTOs that year. In 2017, Tyler Jewell took over as CEO. In 2019, Vinny Smith became the Executive Chairman.

WSO2's first product was code-named Tungsten, and was meant for the development of web applications. Tungsten was followed by WSO2 Titanium, which later became WSO2 Enterprise Service Bus (ESB). In 2006, Intel Capital invested $4 million in WSO2, and continued to invest in subsequent years. In 2010, Godel Technologies invested in WSO2 for an unspecified amount, and in 2012 the company raised a third round of $10 million. Official WSO2 records point to this being from Toba Capital, Cisco and Intel Capital. In August 2015, a funding round led by Pacific Controls and Toba raised another $20 million.

The company gained recognition from a 2011 report in Information Week that eBay used WSO2 ESB as a key element of their transaction-processing software. Research firm Gartner noted that WSO2 was a leading competitor in the application infrastructure market of 2014.

As of 2019, WSO2 has offices in: Mountain View, California; New York City; London, UK; São Paulo, Brazil; Sydney, Australia; Berlin, Germany and Colombo, Sri Lanka. The bulk of its research and operations are conducted from its main office in Colombo.

A subsidiary, WSO2Mobile, was launched in 2013, with Harsha Purasinghe of Microimage as the CEO and co-founder. In March 2015, WSO2.Telco was launched in partnership with Malaysian telecommunications company Axiata, which held a majority stake in the venture. WSO2Mobile has since been re-absorbed into its parent company.

Historically, WSO2 has had a close connection to the Apache community, with a significant portion of their products based on or contributing to the Apache product stack. Likewise, many of WSO2's top leadership have contributed to Apache projects. In 2013, WSO2 donated its Stratos project to Apache.

Products
WSO2 products are released under the Apache License Version 2. Like the Apache project itself, WSO2 follows open development principles and publishes architecture and development discussions.

WSO2 offers a platform of middleware products for agile integration, application programming interface (API) management, identity and access management, and smart analytics.

In June 2015, WSO2 announced software as a service versions of its open-source products.

Products include:
WSO2 Enterprise Integrator, an open-source hybrid integration platform which allows developers to integrate applications, data or systems.
WSO2 API Manager, an API management program that allows enterprises to create, publish and manage APIs. It supports API lifecycle management, application development, access control, rate limiting and analytics in one system.
WSO2 Identity Server, which provides identity management capabilities.
WSO2 Stream Processor, a streaming SQL engine that supports real-time streaming analytics.
Ballerina, a general-purpose concurrent and strongly typed programming language with both textual and graphical syntaxes, optimized for integration.

See also 
WSO2 Mashup Server
WSO2 Carbon
Enterprise service bus
Apache Software Foundation
Amazon Web Services
Google App Engine
Azure Services Platform
Information Technology in Sri Lanka

References

External links
 

Software companies of Sri Lanka
Software companies of the United States
2005 establishments in California